Birgit  Lavrijssen (born 16 January 1991) is a road cyclist from the Netherlands. She participated at the 2012 UCI Road World Championships in the Women's team time trial for the Sengers Ladies Cycling Team.

References

External links
 profile at procyclingstats.com

1991 births
Dutch female cyclists
Living people
Sportspeople from Maastricht
Cyclists from Limburg (Netherlands)
21st-century Dutch women